is a Japanese sprinter.

Nashimoto competed in the 100 metre sprint at the 2009 Asian Youth Games and 2010 Summer Youth Olympics, both held in Singapore, winning gold and silver respectively. In the latter, Nashimoto lost out to Odean Skeen but beat favourite David Bolarinwa to silver in a photo finish.

His personal best in the 100 metres is 10.38 seconds set in 2011.

International competition

References

External links

1993 births
Living people
Japanese male sprinters
Sportspeople from Chiba Prefecture
Athletes (track and field) at the 2010 Summer Youth Olympics
21st-century Japanese people